The Solicitor-General of Western Australia, known informally as the Solicitor-General, is the state's Second Law Officer, after the Attorney General who is the state's First Law Officer. The Solicitor-General serves as one of the legal and constitutional advisers of the government in Western Australia. The Solicitor-General usually appears on behalf of the State of Western Australia in the High Court of Australia, in litigation where the State or a Minister is a party or where the Attorney General of Western Australia intervenes in constitutional litigation. Such litigation typically concerns the constitutional validity of legislation, or the validity of executive action by the government.

The Solicitor-General is addressed in court as "Mr/Ms Solicitor". Despite the title, the position is usually occupied by a senior barrister, although any Australian lawyer of at least eight years experience is eligible for appointment. The current Solicitor-General is Joshua Thomson .

The office of Solicitor-General is not a political office. The Solicitor-General is required to provide independent legal advice to the government of Western Australia. The Solicitor-General does not provide advice to members of the public, unless permitted to do so by a right of private practice granted by the Governor under s. 6 of the Solicitor-General Act 1969 (WA).

History and function 
The Solicitor-General Act 1969 (WA) provides for the office and functions of Solicitor-General. The appointment is made by the Governor for the State of Western Australia upon the advice of the Executive Council.  The Act provides for an appointment for a term not exceeding seven years, with the possibility of renewal. By s. 9 of the Solicitor-General Act 1969 (WA), the Solicitor-General may act as counsel for the State of Western Australia or for any other body for whom the Attorney General requests him to act, and may perform such other duties of counsel as the Attorney General directs. The Solicitor-General may also exercise statutory functions conferred by other legislation upon him or her. The Solicitor-General can also exercise statutory powers of the Attorney-General, which have been delegated in accordance with s.13 of the Solicitor-General Act 1969 (WA). 

A list of people who have previously occupied the office of Solicitor-General of Western Australia: 

Notably:

 Sydney Howard Good MBE QC was appointed as the first Chief Judge of the District Court of Western Australia;
 Ronald Darling Wilson CMG QC was appointed as the first Western Australian justice of the High Court of Australia;
 Kevin Horace Parker AO QC was a Judge of the Supreme Court of Western Australia and a Judge and Vice-President of the International Criminal Tribunal for the Former Yugoslavia;
 Robert Mackenzie Mitchell SC is a Judge of Appeal of the Supreme Court of Western Australia;
 Peter Damien Quinlan SC is the Chief Justice of the Supreme Court of Western Australia.

References 

Solicitors-General of Australia
Western Australia